In knot theory, a prime knot or prime link is a knot that is, in a certain sense, indecomposable. Specifically, it is a non-trivial knot which cannot be written as the knot sum of two non-trivial knots.  Knots that are not prime are said to be composite knots or composite links. It can be a nontrivial problem to determine whether a given knot is prime or not.

A family of examples of prime knots are the torus knots. These are formed by wrapping a circle around a torus p times in one direction and q times in the other, where p and q are coprime integers.

Knots are characterized by their crossing numbers. The simplest prime knot is the trefoil with three crossings. The trefoil is actually a (2, 3)-torus knot. The figure-eight knot, with four crossings, is the simplest non-torus knot. For any positive integer n, there are a finite number of prime knots with n crossings. The first few values  are given in the following table.
{| class="wikitable" style="text-align:right;"
|-
! n
| 1 || 2 || 3 || 4 || 5 || 6 || 7 || 8 || 9 || 10 || 11  || 12 || 13 || 14 || 15 || 16
|-
! Number of prime knotswith n crossings 
| 0 || 0 || 1 || 1 || 2 || 3 || 7 || 21 || 49 || 165 || 552  ||2176 || 9988 || 46972 || 253293 || 1388705
|-
! Composite knots
| 0 || 0 || 0 || 0 || 0 || 2 || 1 || 4 || ... ||  || ...  ||  || ... ||  || ... || 
|-
! Total
| 0 || 0 ||  ||  ||  ||  ||  ||  || ... ||  || ...  ||  || ... ||  || ... || 
|}

Enantiomorphs are counted only once in this table and the following chart (i.e. a knot and its mirror image are considered equivalent).



Schubert's theorem
A theorem due to Horst Schubert (1919-2001) states that every knot can be uniquely expressed as a connected sum of prime knots.

See also
 List of prime knots

References

External links

Knot invariants
 
Knots (knot theory)